Pollo Brujo is a fast food chain of chicken restaurants, which operates with 10 locations in Guatemala, as well as in Colombia, Costa Rica, and Mexico.

Incident

On October 28, 2019, a Pollo Brujo security worker was found dead inside the company's Merida, Mexico location. The Secretaria de Seguridad Publica, a Mexican police investigative department, is investigating the death.

See also
List of chicken restaurants
Pollo Campero

External links

Companies of Guatemala
Fast-food restaurants
Restaurants in Mexico
Restaurants in Guatemala